The Premio Zóbel is a Philippine literary award conferred on Filipino writers in the Spanish language. It was established to revivify the Spanish language and to promote the best writing created by Filipino authors in the language. Founded in 1920, it is the only literary prize in Asia that promotes Spanish-language literature, and is also the oldest literary award in the country.

Mechanics 
The primary objective of the Premio Zóbel is to give recognition Filipino writers in and advocates for Spanish language. The candidate must possess Spanish fluency. Awardees are judged members of the Philippine Academy of the Spanish Language. In recent years, the criteria in selecting the winners had broadened. They may or may not need to have written a body of work, as the recognition can be given to anyone who champion the Spanish language.

History 
The Premio Zóbel was founded by businessman and philanthropist Enrique Zóbel de Ayala in 1920, considered to be the oldest literary award in the Philippines and the only literary prize in Asia dedicated to promoting the Spanish language. Zóbel advocated for the preservation of linkage between the Philippines and Spain through culture and the cultivation of Philippine literature in Spanish. He established the award amidst the American colonization in the first few decades of the 20th century, the rise of the English language as medium of instruction in schools, and the waning of the use of the Spanish language as lingua franca in government and the elite. He was quoted to have said, "No quiero que el español muera en Filipinas. ("I don’t want Spanish to die in the Philippines.")" The award was continued by his daughter, Gloria Zóbel de Padilla, after his demise.

The awarding ceremony had been previously held at the Casino Español de Manila. It was later moved to the InterContinental Manila hotel. At its height, it was a literary and social event covered extensively in the media.

Present 
Currently, the award is organized under the leadership of the children of Gloria Zóbel de Padilla - Georgina Z. Padilla de Mac-Crohon and Alejandro Z. Padilla.

The history of Spanish language in the Philippines, history of the Zóbel de Ayala family, history of the Premio Zóbel, and short biographies of past winners as well as excerpts of their work are contained in the book, "81 Years of Premio Zóbel: A Legacy of Philippine Literature in Spanish". Written by the 1998 awardee professor Lourdes Brillantes, it was supported by Spanish Embassy Ambassador Delfin Colome and the Fundacion Santiago for the Philippine Centennial.

List of Winners 
Below is the list of awardees through the years.

Further reading 
 Brillantes, Lourdes Castrillo. 81 Years of Premio Zóbel: A Legacy of Philippine Literature in Spanish, Filipinas Heritage Library (2006)

References 

1920 establishments in the Philippines
Awards established in 1920
Philippine literary awards
Spanish language in the Philippines
Spanish-language literary awards